The 2014-15 edition of the Lebanese FA Cup is the 43rd edition to be played. It is the premier knockout tournament for football teams in Lebanon.

The winners qualify for the 2016 AFC Cup.

The qualifying rounds take place in late 2014 with the Premier League clubs joining at the Round of 16 in early 2015.

Round of 16

Quarter-final

Semi-final

Final

External links
Futbol24.com 
soccerway.com

Lebanese FA Cup seasons
Cup
Leb